John "Jack" White (15 August 1873 – 24 March 1949) was a Scottish professional golfer. He posted six top-10 finishes in the Open Championship, including a victory in 1904.

Early life
White was born at Pefferside, Whitekirk, four miles east of North Berwick. He was the son of James White, an agricultural labourer, and his wife Emily Thomson White. Jack worked as a caddie from the age of ten. Like many early professionals he trained as a clubmaker. From his late teens he worked as a golf professional at the North Berwick Golf Club in the summer and at York Golf Club in England in the winter.

Golf career
White first played in The Open Championship in 1891 and in 1904, when it was played at Royal St George's, where he won his only major championship. He was the professional at the prestigious Sunningdale Golf Club outside London for over twenty five years from 1902.

Death and legacy
White died in 1949 in Musselburgh. He is best remembered as the winner of the 1904 Open Championship.

Major championships

Wins (1)

Results timeline

Note: White only played in The Open Championship and the U.S. Open.

NYF = Tournament not yet founded
NT = No tournament
WD = Withdrew
? = unknown
"T" indicates a tie for a place

Team appearances
England–Scotland Professional Match (representing Scotland): 1903 (winners), 1904 (tie), 1905 (tie), 1906, 1907, 1909, 1912 (tie), 1913

References

External links

Famous North Berwick Golfers profile

Scottish male golfers
Winners of men's major golf championships
1873 births
1949 deaths